Düsseldorf-based Surplex GmbH is an industrial auction house specializing in trading in second-hand machinery. The company buys and sells used machinery and industrial equipment worldwide, carries out online auctions and offers appraisals and valuations.

History

Foundation
Surplex.com AG was founded by the brothers Bruno and Florian Schick at the end of 1999 as a start-up company of the Dotcom-era. The core idea was to develop an online marketplace that would simplify the trade in second-hand machinery and make the highly segmented second-hand machinery market more transparent.

International venture capital consortia such as the Carlyle Group or the French Vivendi Group awarded a total of around EUR 50 million. Prominent private investors, such as Lars Schlecker, Lars Windhorst, Marc Schrempp or Fiat president Paolo Fresco also invested in Surplex.

Surplex's B2B platform was named the best platform by Forrester Research in 2001. Until 2006 Surplex published the world's largest trade magazine for used industrial goods, Communicator (circulation: 45,000).

Crisis (2001–2003)
With the bursting of the Dot-com bubble, Surplex.com AG also fell into a severe crisis. Branches were closed, the company headquarters were moved back from Berlin to Düsseldorf and most of the 140 jobs were cut. In March 2003, the management was taken over by Michael Werker, who had come to Surplex from the traditional mechanical engineering group Deutz.

Consolidation (2004–2009)
Between 2004 and 2009, the auction platform surplex.com was steadily developed. Since then Surplex has conducted large industrial auctions, e.g. for Linde, ABB, ThyssenKrupp and Bayer.  The initially purely digital business model was supplemented by analogue services, as is customary in the classic machinery trade. With this strategy of dovetailing online and offline services, Michael Werker and Uli Stalter founded Surplex GmbH in early 2009.

Internationalisation (since 2010)
Surplex GmbH has been growing steadily since 2010. The number of employees increased from 15 to over 200 by 2020, while turnover climbed to almost EUR 100 million (2019). In 2013, the Italian Surplex Srl was founded as the first branch office outside Germany. Today, Surplex has offices in 13 European countries (as of November 2020), including Spain, France and the UK.

Since summer 2020, Ghislaine Duijmelings has been leading the company as its third managing director, alongside Michael Werker and Ulrich Stalter.

Products
In 2020, the auction platform in 16 languages is the core of the business. With more than 500 auctions, over 55,000 industrial goods are sold per year. These industrial goods usually come from plant closures, restructurings or insolvencies. Surplex offers direct sales as well as all offline services needed to trade used machinery globally.
These include dismantling, loading and customs clearance.  Under the brand name Valuplex, Surplex provides appraisals and valuations.

References

German auction houses
Retail companies established in 1999
Companies based in Düsseldorf
1999 establishments in Germany